Paul Baum may refer to:

 Paul Baum (artist) (1859–1932), German landscape painter
 Paul Baum (mathematician) (born 1936), American mathematician